Sarah Blagden is an associate professor of experimental cancer therapeutics at the University of Oxford in the Department of Oncology at Oxford. Her research is investigating post-transcriptional mechanisms for cancer behavior and novel cancer therapeutics for people with advanced malignancies.

Education 
Sarah Blagden received a medical degree (MBBS) at Charing Cross and Westminster Medical School, University of London in 1994.

In 2004 she received a PhD (as CRUK Clinical Fellow) at Cambridge University

Career 
After Blagden completed her medical training and subsequent specialist training in Medical Oncology at Addenbrooke's Hospital in Cambridge and the Royal Mardsden Hospital she went on to hold a Clinical Fellowship at the Institute of Cancer Research's Drug Development Unit. She was appointed to Senior Lecturer and Honorary Consultant at the Imperial College in 2006 and became a Director of Imperial's Early Cancer Trials Unit and was able to established her own laboratory for studying the dysregulation of mRNA translation in cancer.

Blagden was also a chief/Principal investigator for a number of national and international clinical studies. She is a Researcher and Associate Professor of Experimental Cancer therapeutics at the University of Oxford in the department of oncology

She was a cofounder of the LARP Society, a scientific society dedicated to the study of La-related family of proteins.  She serves on the Editorial Board of the British Journal of Cancer.

Awards 
CRUK Junior Clinician Scientist PhD fellowship in 1999 at Cambridge University
CRUK clinical Fellow PhD in 2004 at Cambridge University.
Fellowship of Royal College Physicians in 2010

References 

Living people
British oncologists
Women oncologists
Year of birth missing (living people)
Alumni of the University of London
Alumni of the University of Cambridge
Medical scholars of the University of Oxford
21st-century British medical doctors
British women medical doctors
Fellows of the Royal College of Physicians